The Dabestān-e Mazāheb "school of religions" is a Persian language work that examines and compares Abrahamic religions, Dharmic religions and sects of the mid-17th century Southern Eurasia. The work, whose authorship is uncertain, was probably composed in about 1655 CE. The text's title is also transliterated as Dabistān-i Mazāhib , Dabistan-e Madahib, or Dabestan-e Madaheb.

The text is best known for its chapter on the Dīn-i Ilāhī, the syncretic religion propounded by the Mughal emperor Jalāl ud-Dīn Muḥammad Akbar ("Akbar the Great") after 1581 and is possibly the most reliable account of the Ibādat Khāna discussions that led up to this.

Authorship 

Several manuscripts have been discovered that identifies the author as Mīr Du’l-feqār Ardestānī (also known as Mollah Mowbad). Mir Du'lfiqar is now generally accepted as the author of this work."

Before these manuscripts were discovered, however, Sir William Jones identified the author as Mohsin Fani Kashmiri. In 1856, a Parsi named Keykosrow b. Kāvūs claimed Khosrow Esfandiyar as the author, who was son of Azar Kayvan.

Editions 

This work was first printed by Nazar Ashraf in a very accurate edition in movable type at Calcutta in 1809 (an offset reprint of this edition was published by Ali Asghar Mustafawi from Teheran in 1982). A lithographed edition was published by Ibrahim bin Nur Muhammad from Bombay in AH 1292 (1875). In 1877, Munshi Nawal Kishore published another Lithographed edition from Lucknow. The distinguished Persian scholar Francis Gladwin translated the chapter on the Persians into English and published it from Calcutta in 1789. A German version by E. Dalburg from Wurzburg was published in 1809. The chapter on the Raushanyas was translated into English by J. Leyden for the Asiatic Researches, xi, Calcutta. The entire work was translated into English by David Shea and Anthony Troyer under the title, The Dabistan or School of Manners (1843) in three volumes from London.

The author describes that he spent time in Patna, Kashmir, Lahore, Surat and Srikakulam (Andhra Pradesh). He is perceived to have been a person of great scholarship and curiosity, and extremely open-minded for the context of his time. He mentions numerous interviews with scholars of numerous faiths, which suggests that he was well connected, and so qualified to report on the Dīn-i Ilāhī.

According to The Jew in the Lotus by Rodger Kamenetz, a Dabistan was commissioned by a Mughal mystic prince, Dara Shikoh. The section on Judaism consists of translations by a Persian Jew, Sarmad Kashani, and his Hindu disciple from Sindh. Walter Fischel notes:  An English version of the Dabistan by David Shea (1843) is available at the Digital Library of India IISc.

Outline
The text is divided into twelve ta‘lims (chapters):
 Chapter I. Religious traditions of the Persian.
Sipásíán, Jemsháspián, Samrádíán, Khodáníán, Rádían, Shídrangíán, Pykeríán, Miláníán, Aláríán, Shídábíán, Akhshíán, Zerdushtián (Zoroastrian), Mazdakíán.
 Chapter II. Hindus.
Smártí (Smarta Tradition), Vedanta Sankhya, Jogís (Yoga), Saktíán (Shakta), Vishnú (Vishnu), Chárvákián, Tárkikán, Búdah (actually Jain), and several new sects including
Sanyási, Avaduta, Jangama, Sufi-Hindus (Madárían, Jelalían, Kakan), Yógi, Narayaní (Gosáin Haridas), Dadu Panthi, Píára panthi, Gosáin Jáni, Surya-makhan, Chandra bhakta, Pavana bhakta, Jala bhakta, Prithivi bhakta (earth worshippers), Manushya bhakta (humanists), Nanak-Panthi (Sikh).
 Chapter III. Kera Tabitian (Tibetan Buddhism), as learned from unsatisfactory translation.
 Chapter IV. Yahuds (Jews), as learned from Sufi Sarmad Kashani, who was born a Jew and described himself as neither Jewish nor Muslim nor Hindu.
 Chapter V. Tarsa (Christians).
 Chapter VI. Muhammedans (Muslims).
Sonnites (Sunni), Shíâhs (Shia), Akhbárin, Ismâiliah (Ismaili), Ali Ilahian.
 Chapter VII. Sádakíah, founded by Musaylima, a contemporary of Muhammad.
 Chapter VIII. Váhadiáh (Unitarians), a central Asian religion founded by Váhed Mahmúd.
 Chapter IX. Rósheníán (Roshanniya), a central Asian religion founded by Pir Roshan.
 Chapter X. Ilahíah (Din-e-Ilahi).
 Chapter XI. Wise (Philosophers who studied the Hellenic tradition)
 Chapter XII. Súfíah (Sufis).

Chapter II includes one of the earliest historical account of the Sikhs.

References

External links
 Translation by Shea and Troyer at the Packard Humanities Institute, also at The Dabestan-e Madaheb, or 'School of religious doctrines'
 Copies of the text in the Khuda Bakhsh Oriental Public Library

Persian-language literature
History of religion in India
History of religion in Pakistan
1655 books
Religious studies
Zoroastrian mysticism
17th-century Indian books
Indian religious texts